The 8×22mm Nambu is a rimless, bottleneck handgun cartridge introduced in Imperial Japan in 1904, used in the Type 100 submachine gun, Nambu pistols (Type A, the Type B and Type 14) and the Nambu Type 94 pistol. The 8×22mm round was used during the Pacific War and Second Sino-Japanese War.

Origins 
Towards the end of the 19th century, certain semi-automatic pistol designs began to see production, such as the Borchardt C-93 and Mauser C96. Japan, in the midst of the Meiji Restoration, was keen to not fall behind when it came to military technology, and devised a replacement for their Type 26 revolver. By 1902, the first Nambu pistol was developed, which was chambered in 8×22mm Nambu. Initially produced for Japanese army and naval officers' private purchase, the 8×22mm Nambu was not officially adopted until 1926 when it was designated as the Type 14 pistol cartridge.

Usage 
The 8×22mm Nambu round was first used in the Nambu pistols, which were first used during the Russo-Japanese War. Major usage didn't begin until the Second Sino-Japanese War and Pacific War, during which time, the Type 100 submachine gun was created, which also fired 8×22mm Nambu. By the war's end in 1945, around 400,000 Nambu pistols and 8,500 Type 100s had been produced. Small batches of Nambu pistols were also exported to Siam and China before World War II.

After World War II, there were isolated reports of 8×22mm usage by the Viet Cong during the opening stages of the Vietnam War and the Chinese Communist forces in the Korean War. Afterwards there was no major demand to keep the 8×22mm round afloat, and the post-war Japan Self-Defense Forces swiftly replaced it with the 9×19mm Parabellum, which during World War II was already in use in the United Kingdom and Germany. The JSDF replaced the Nambu pistol and Type 100 with the SIG Sauer P220 and Minebea PM-9, respectively.

In 1939, the cost of 8×22mm Nambu ammunition manufactured by the Imperial Japanese Army's arsenals was 390 yen per 10,000 rounds. Because of the rarity and historical impact of the 8×22mm Nambu, it has become popular among post-war collectors. A box of just 15 rounds was sold in 2009 for $250.

Performance 
The muzzle energy of the 8×22mm Nambu is half that of the 9×19mm, and less than half of the 7.62×25mm Tokarev, and it is often regarded as lacking in stopping power. However, its overall stopping power is comparable to that of the 9×17mm (.380 ACP), which was used by German and Italian officers during World War II.

See also
8 mm caliber
List of handgun cartridges
List of World War II infantry weapons – Japan

References

External links
Small Arms of WWI Primer 070: Japanese Nambu Type A Modified, at C&Rsenal
Nambu World, Original & Collectible Ammo, at Nambu World

 
Pistol and rifle cartridges
Military cartridges
World War II infantry weapons of Japan
Weapons and ammunition introduced in 1904